Xestospongia  is a genus of sponges in the family Petrosiidae. It contains the following species:

 Xestospongia arenosa van Soest & de Weerdt, 2001
 Xestospongia bergquistia Fromont, 1991
 Xestospongia bocatorensis Díaz, Thacker, Rützler & Piantoni, 2007
 Xestospongia caminata Pulitzer-Finali, 1986
 Xestospongia clavata Pulitzer-Finali, 1993
 Xestospongia coralloides (Dendy, 1924)
 Xestospongia delaubenfelsi Riveros, 1951
 Xestospongia deweerdtae Lehnert & van Soest, 1999
 Xestospongia diprosopia (de Laubenfels, 1930)
 Xestospongia dubia (Ristau, 1978)
 Xestospongia emphasis (de Laubenfels, 1954)
 Xestospongia friabilis (Topsent, 1892)
 Xestospongia grayi (Hechtel, 1983)
 Xestospongia hispida (Ridley & Dendy, 1886)
 Xestospongia informis Pulitzer-Finali, 1993
 Xestospongia kapne Carvalho, Lopes, Cosme & Hajdu, 2016
 Xestospongia madida (de Laubenfels, 1954)
 Xestospongia mammillata Pulitzer-Finali, 1982
 Xestospongia menzeli (Little, 1963)
 Xestospongia muta (Schmidt, 1870)
 Xestospongia novaezealandiae Bergquist & Warne, 1980
 Xestospongia papuensis Pulitzer-Finali, 1996
 Xestospongia plana (Topsent, 1892)
 Xestospongia portoricensis van Soest, 1980
 Xestospongia purpurea Rützler, Piantoni, van Soest & Díaz, 2014
 Xestospongia rampa (de Laubenfels, 1934)
 Xestospongia ridleyi (Keller, 1891)
 Xestospongia testudinaria (Lamarck, 1815)
 Xestospongia topsenti Van Soest & Hooper, 2020
 Xestospongia tuberosa Pulitzer-Finali, 1993
 Xestospongia vansoesti Bakus & Nishiyama, 2000
 Xestospongia variabilis (Ridley, 1884)
 Xestospongia viridenigra (Vacelet, Vasseur & Lévi, 1976)
 Xestospongia wiedenmayeri van Soest, 1980

References

Petrosina